'Landsberger Reinette' is a cultivar of domesticated apple that originated in Gorzow Wielkopolski, Poland. Synonymes: Surprise and Reneta Gorzowska. It is also ambiguously known as 'Surprise' apple. It is a parent of the 'Minister von Hammerstein' apple, which is in turn a parent of 'Geheimrat Doktor Oldenburg'.

References

Apple cultivars